Ericameria suffruticosa, the singlehead goldenbush, is a subshrub to shrub in the family Asteraceae found in the western United States (California, Nevada, Oregon, Idaho, Nevada, Wyoming, Montana). "Suffruticosa" means "shrublike".

Description
It has sticky, small, gray-green leaves that are wavy at the edges and highly aromatic when crushed. One plant can produce several yellow flower heads with irregular structure, having its few disk flowers pointing in all directions, and 1-6 ray flowers haphazardly placed around the disk.

References

External links
 Jepson eFlora: Ericameria suffruticosa

suffruticosa
Alpine flora
Flora of California
Flora of Nevada
Flora of the Northwestern United States
Flora of the Sierra Nevada (United States)
Plants described in 1840
Taxa named by Thomas Nuttall
Flora without expected TNC conservation status